King for a Day is a song by American rock band Pierce the Veil released on June 5, 2012. It features guest vocals by Kellin Quinn of Sleeping with Sirens. It is the first official single from their third studio album Collide with the Sky (2012).

On August 6, 2012, an official music video was released. The song charted on Hot Rock Songs and the Digital Rock Songs charts, both published by Billboard. "King for a Day" was nominated for both Best Single and Best Video at the 2013 Kerrang! Awards.

Background and recording 
The title of the song came from drummer Mike Fuentes. In an interview with Revolver, lead vocalist Vic Fuentes said he was impressed by the title. Together with Curtis Peoples and Steve Miller, Fuentes started to write the song lyrics in a small cabin in Big Bear Lake, California which became later a small recording studio.

Because of the fans, the band contacted Kellin Quinn of Sleeping with Sirens asking if he was interested in being featured on the song. They never met before but Fuentes decided to write to him on Twitter. Quinn decided to collaborate with Pierce the Veil. His vocal parts were recorded in a second studio. While producing the song, Pierce the Veil and Kellin Quinn wrote together via email.

Meaning 
This song is about getting pushed past the breaking point. In an interview, Fuentes stated he sometimes has too many things around his mind at once so he isn't able to control his mind or his body at times.

Music video 
An official music video was directed by Drew Russ who would get involved later in their music video for "Bulls in the Bronx". On June 25, 2012 Alternative Press announced Pierce the Veil started working on a new music video. On August 2, 2012, the band published an official trailer for the music video. Four days later the video officially was premiered on Vevo.

The video portrays Vic Fuentes and Kellin Quinn as bankers. The bank manager Mr. Smalls asks both to stay in the bank overnight to correct the sales values for an IRS audit. In doing this they discover that Mr. Smalls transferred more than $2,500,000 to an offshore bank in Switzerland (although it is written as "Switerland" in the music video), which was most likely the reason for the forced pay cut the employees had taken a week before.

At the beginning of the second verse, Quinn and Fuentes meet with other people (played by the other band members of Pierce the Veil) who plan to rob the bank. In the chorus, Fuentes and Quinn enter the building in black suits. In the bridge, the gang arrive and get into the bank. Mr. Smalls is caught by a robber while all the bankers hide. The robbers get into the safe-deposit and start collecting the money in bags, which they later give to the employees. While he is tied up Mr. Smalls pees all over himself. When they're ready to flee, one of the robbers shoots Mr. Smalls with a water gun at which point he realizes they have cheated him.

At the end of the video, the robbers celebrate their victory while Mr. Smalls is arrested due to tax evasion and embezzlement and sentenced to 25 years in prison, which was released on the news station the robbers watch during their celebration.

A behind-the-scenes-video was published on October 3, 2012, on YouTube.

Reception

Commercial 
"King for a Day" was released as the first single of Collide with the Sky on June 5, 2012. On the same day a lyric-video was published on YouTube which got nearly 30 million views. On August 6, 2012, the official music video was released and has garnered 137 million views as of October 17, 2021.

The single charted on the U.S. Billboard Digital Rock Songs where it peaked at 29, and on the Hot Rock Songs chart with a peak of 37. The song also peaked at 28 in the UK Rock & Metal Singles Charts. In November 2014, the song was certified Gold by the RIAA for having sold more than 500,000 units in the U.S. On October 29, 2019, it was announced the single went Platinum, selling more than one million units digitally.

On May 12, 2015, it was revealed that "King for a Day" will be one of the playable songs in the video game Guitar Hero Live. It was also announced that King for a Day will be available for downloadable content for Rock Band 4 when pre-ordered digitally on Xbox One.

On August 17, 2022, "King for a Day" reached 1 on the U.S. Billboard Hard Rock Streaming Songs Chart, 7 on the Rock Streaming Songs Chart, 6 on Alternative Streaming Songs Chart, and 21 on Alternative Digital Song Sales Chart thanks to a surge in usage of the song on Tik-Tok.

Awards 
 Alternative Press Readers poll
 2012: Best Single (won)
 Kerrang! Awards
 2013: Best Video (won)
 2013: Best Single (nominated)

Charts

Certifications

References 

Pierce the Veil songs
Songs written by Vic Fuentes
2012 songs
2012 singles
Vocal collaborations